The 2006–07 A.C. Mantova season was the club's 96th season in existence and the club's second consecutive in the second division of Italian football. In addition to the domestic league, Mantova participated in this season's edition of the Coppa Italia.

Competitions

Overview

Serie B

League table

Results summary

Results by round

Matches

Coppa Italia

References

External links

Mantova 1911 seasons
Mantova